Shaming of the Sun, sometimes mislabeled as Shaming the Sun, is the sixth studio album by the Indigo Girls, released in 1997. It was the duo's highest-charting album in the U.S., peaking at number 7 on the Billboard 200.

Track listing
"Shame on You" (Amy Ray)  – 4:04
"Get Out the Map" (Emily Saliers)  – 3:25
"Shed Your Skin" (Ray)  – 4:10
"It's Alright" (Saliers)  – 3:05
"Caramia" (Saliers)  – 5:48
"Don't Give That Girl a Gun" (Ray)  – 4:38
"Leeds" (Saliers)  – 3:34
"Scooter Boys" (Ray)  – 2:57
"Everything in Its Own Time" (Saliers)  – 5:17
"Cut It Out" (Ray)  – 3:53
"Burn All the Letters" (Saliers)  – 4:09
"Hey Kind Friend" (Ray)  – 5:49

Personnel
Amy Ray – lead & backing vocals; acoustic, electric & 12-string guitars; mandolin; piano (7, 10); bouzouki
Emily Saliers – lead & backing vocals, acoustic & electric guitars, dulcimer (12), banjo (1, 2), Dobro (4), piano (7, 10), harmonium, hurdy-gurdy

Additional musicians
Sara Lee – bass (except 7, 11), string arrangements (5), Hammond B-3 organ and whistle (12) 
Jerry Marotta – drums, percussion (1, 2, 4, 5, 9 11), harmonium (9), Taos drum (1)
Steve Earle – backing vocals & harmonica (1)
Dallas Austin, Jama Carter, Quentin Bush (all 2), Michelle Malone (8) - backing vocals
Carmen Caballero, Pura Fé Crescioni and Jennifer Kreisberg (Ulali) – additional vocals (3, 7, 11)
Josh Freese, Chris Verene – drums (3, 6)
Kenny Greenberg – guitars (5, 10)
Michael Lorant – backing vocals (6), piano (10)
Andy Stochansky – drums (8, 10), percussion (5, 8), dumbek and talking drum (11)
Lisa Germano – mandolin (9), violin (9, 11)
Sheila Doyle, Michael Lorant, Candy Jiosne – piano (10)
Dave Richards – acoustic bass (11)
David & Ellie Arenz, Jun-Ching Lin, Willard Shull, Sou-Chun Su – violin
Paul Murphy, Heidi Nitchie – viola
Kristin Wilkinson – conductor
Micky Raphael - harmonica (11)

Smoke (track 12)
Benjamin - Words, Friend
William W Taft: coronet, humor
Timothy P Campion: drums, rake
Coleman T Lewis: electric guitar, hick sounds
Brian F Halloran: cello, rescue

Technical personnel
Produced By David Leonard & Indigo Girls
Engineers: Caram Costanzo, Marc Frigo, David Leonard
Assistant Engineers: Alex Lowe, Ryan Williams
Mixing: David Leonard
Mastering: Bob Ludwig

References

1997 albums
Indigo Girls albums
Epic Records albums
Albums produced by David Leonard (record producer)